Ghana Exports Promotion Authority is a state organization with the mandate to develop, facilitate and promote Ghanaian exports.

Establishment 
The institution was established in 1969 by Act 369 as an agency of the Ministry of Trade and Industry.

Structure 
GEPA headquarters are in Accra, with regional offices in Ho, Tamale, Bolgatanga, Takoradi, Cape Coast and Kumasi. The GEPA consist of multiple divisions:

 Agri-business and Product Development Division
 Marketing and Promotion Division
 Industrial Arts and Crafts Division
 Research and Information Division
 Finance Division
 Administration and Human Resource Division

References 


Government agencies of Ghana